Acacia dimidiata is a small tree belonging to the genus Acacia in the subgenus Juliflorae. It is native to northern Australia, being found in both in the Northern Territory, and Queensland. It is considered a species of least concern in the Northern Territory and Queensland.

Aboriginal language names
MalakMalak, Matngala: Pari. Wagiman: garninyjan. Warray: wirril

Description
Its branchlets are silvery, ribbed and densely hairy. It blooms from March to July, fruiting from August to October. Its stipules are persistent, brown and hairy. There are four to five primary veins springing from the phyllode base. It has prominent glands at the pulvinus. Inflorescences are deep yellow spikes in the phyllode axils. It grows in open forest.

References

External links
 World wide wattle: Acacia dimidiata
 Flora of the Northern Territory: Mimosaceae

dimidiata
Flora of Queensland
Flora of the Northern Territory